{{Infobox academic
| honorific_prefix   =
| name               = Michael F. Bird
| honorific_suffix   = 
| native_name        = 
| native_name_lang   = 
| image              = 
| image_size         = 
| alt                = 
| caption            = 
| birth_name         = 
| birth_date         = 
| birth_place        = Paderborn, West Germany
| death_date         = 
| region             = 
| nationality        = Australian
| occupation         = Academic Dean and Lecturer in Theology and New Testament, Ridley College (Melbourne)
| period             = 
| signature          = 
| signature_size     = 
| signature_alt      = 
| education          = 
| alma_mater         = Ph.D., University of Queensland
| thesis_title       = Many will come from the East and the West: Jesus and the Origins of the Gentile Mission
| thesis_url         = 
| thesis_year        = 2005
| school_tradition   = 
| doctoral_advisor   = Rick Strelan & Robert L. Webb
| academic_advisors  = 
| influences         = 
| era                = 
| discipline         = New Testament and Theology
| sub_discipline     = Pauline studies, Christology, Patristics
| workplaces         =  
| main_interests     = 
| notable_works      = The New Testament in Its World"; "Evangelical Theology"; "The Gospel of the Lord"; "Romans" in the Story of God Commentary Series
| notable_ideas      = 
| influenced         = 
| website            =www.patheos.com/blogs/euangelion
}}

Michael F. Bird (born 18 November 1974, Paderborn, West Germany) is an Australian Anglican priest, theologian, and New Testament scholar.

Biography
In his teenage years, Bird was an atheist who saw Christianity, "as a way of oppressing people, a purely human construct.” After becoming a Christian, he has been a Baptist, Presbyterian, and (most recently) an Anglican. He has recently been called by the evangelical newsletter Eternity News a "heavy hitter" in the world of New Testament scholarship and Jesus's divinity.

Bird is Academic Dean and a lecturer at Ridley College, having previously taught at Brisbane School of Theology and Highland Theological College. He studied at Malyon College and the University of Queensland. He is also Distinguished Research Professor of Theology at Houston Baptist University.

Bird has written a number of books, including The New Testament in Its World (2019, with N. T. Wright), Evangelical Theology: A Biblical and Systematic Introduction (2013) and The Gospel of the Lord: How the Early Church Wrote the Story of Jesus (2014). The Gospel of the Lord won the Biblical Studies section of the 2015 Christianity Today Book Awards. Bird is also the author of a fantasy novel titled Iskandar: And the Immortal King of Iona.''

Bird is a member of the Evangelical Theological Society, Society of Biblical Literature, and Studiorum Novi Testamenti Societas.

In November 2015 he was ordained as a priest for the Anglican Church of Australia.

Works

Books

 - (forthcoming Nov. 2019)

Edited by

References

External links
 
 
 
 

1974 births
Living people
Australian Christian theologians
Australian biblical scholars
Christian bloggers
New Testament scholars
University of Queensland alumni